William Melven was a British historian and author. He wrote, or contributed to, around seventy publications during the late 19th- and early 20th centuries, including Guide to Scotland (1895), A Commercial Gazetteer of the World (1905), John Keltie's A History of the Scottish Highlands: Highland Clans and Highland Regiments (1886) and Ordnance Gazetteer of Scotland (1901) by Francis Hindes Groome.

Selected bibliography 
As author:

 Guide to Scotland (1895)
 The Story of the Massacre of Glencoe: with notes on Ballachulish and Glen Etive (1898)
 A Commercial Gazetteer of the World (1905)

As contributor:

 A History of the Scottish Highlands: Highland Clans and Highland Regiments (John Keltie, 1886)
 Ordnance Gazetteer of Scotland (Francis Hindes Groome, 1901)
 The Business Encyclopaedia and Legal Adviser (W. S. M. Knight, 1907)

References 

Scottish historians
Scottish writers